The men's triple jump event at the 2007 Asian Athletics Championships was held in Amman, Jordan on July 29.

Results

References
Final results

2007 Asian Athletics Championships
Triple jump at the Asian Athletics Championships